Sampsel (also spelled Sampsell) is an unincorporated community in Livingston County, in the U.S. state of Missouri.

History
Sampsel was originally spelled Sampsell, and under the latter name was platted in 1870 when the railroad was extended to that point. The community has the name of J. B. F. Sampsell, a railroad man. A post office called Sampsell Station was established in 1871, the name was changed to Sampsell in 1906, and the post office closed in 1953.

References

Unincorporated communities in Livingston County, Missouri
Unincorporated communities in Missouri